Bestwood St. Albans is a former civil parish in the Newark and Sherwood district of Nottinghamshire, England.  The former parish contains 19 listed buildings that are recorded in the National Heritage List for England.   Of these, four are at Grade II*, the middle of the three grades, and the others are at Grade II, the lowest grade.  The former parish contains Bestwood Village and an area to the east.  The listed buildings include a country house, later a hotel, and associated structures, smaller houses, a church and its lychgate, a water pumping station and associated structures, the winding house and headstocks of a former colliery, an office building, and a war memorial.


Key

Buildings

References

Citations

Sources

 

Lists of listed buildings in Nottinghamshire